Tommy Atkins (often just Tommy) is slang for a common soldier in the British Army.  It was certainly well established during the nineteenth century, but is particularly associated with the First World War. It can be used as a term of reference, or as a form of address. German soldiers would call out to "Tommy" across no man's land if they wished to speak to a British soldier. French and Commonwealth troops would also call British soldiers "Tommies". In more recent times, the term Tommy Atkins has been used less frequently, although the name "Tom" is occasionally still heard; private soldiers in the British Army's Parachute Regiment are still referred to as "Toms".

Etymology

Tommy Atkins or Thomas Atkins has been used as a generic name for a common British soldier for many years. The origin of the term is a subject of debate, but it is known to have been used as early as 1743. A letter sent from Jamaica about a mutiny amongst the troops says "except for those from N. America ye Marines and Tommy Atkins behaved splendidly".

A common belief is that the name was chosen by Arthur Wellesley, 1st Duke of Wellington, after having been inspired by the bravery of a soldier at the Battle of Boxtel in 1794 during the Flanders Campaign. After a fierce engagement, the Duke, in command of the 33rd Regiment of Foot, spotted the best man-at-arms in the regiment, Private Thomas Atkins, terribly wounded. The private said "It's all right, sir. It's all in a day's work" and died shortly after. According to the Imperial War Museum, this theory has Wellington choosing the name in 1843.

According to J. H. Leslie, writing in Notes and Queries in 1912, "Tommy Atkins" was chosen as a generic name by the War Office in 1815, in every sample infantry form in the Soldiers Account Book, signing with a mark.  The Cavalry form had Trumpeter William Jones and Sergeant John Thomas, though they did not use a mark.  Leslie observes the same name in the 1837 King's Regulations, pages 204 and 210, and later editions.  Leslie comments that this disproves the anecdote about the Duke of Wellington selecting the name in 1843.

Richard Holmes, in the prologue to his 2005 book, Tommy, states that:

The Oxford English Dictionary states its origin as "arising out of the casual use of this name in the specimen forms given in the official regulations from 1815 onward"; the citation references Collection of Orders, Regulations, etc., pp. 75–87, published by the War Office, 31 August 1815. The name is used for an exemplary cavalry and infantry soldier; other names used included William Jones and John Thomas.  Thomas Atkins continued to be used in the Soldier's Account Book until the early 20th century.

A further suggestion was given in 1900 by an army chaplain named Reverend E. J. Hardy. He wrote of an incident during the Sepoy Rebellion in 1857. When most of the Europeans in Lucknow were fleeing to the British Residency for protection, a private of the 32nd Regiment of Foot remained on duty at an outpost. Despite the pleas of his comrades, he insisted that he must remain at his post. He was killed at his post, and the Reverend Hardy wrote that "His name happened to be Tommy Atkins and so, throughout the Mutiny Campaign, when a daring deed was done, the doer was said to be 'a regular Tommy Atkins'".

Popular references

Rudyard Kipling published the poem "Tommy" (part of the Barrack-Room Ballads, which were dedicated "To T.A.") in 1892. In reply, William McGonagall wrote "Lines in Praise of Tommy Atkins" in 1898, which was an attack on what McGonagall saw as the disparaging portrayal of Tommy in Kipling's poem.

In 1893, for the musical play A Gaiety Girl, Henry Hamilton (lyrics) and Samuel Potter (music) wrote the song Private Tommy Atkins for the baritone C. Hayden Coffin. It was immediately published by Willcocks & Co. Ltd. in London and published by T. B. Harms & Co. in New York the next year. The song was also reintroduced into later performances of San Toy for Hayden Coffin. He recalled singing it on Ladysmith Night (1 March 1900) where "the audience were roused to such a pitch of enthusiasm, that they rose to their feet, and commenced to shower money on to the stage".

Following the British defeat by the Boers at the Battle of Magersfontein in December 1899, Private Smith of the Black Watch wrote the following poem:

"Tommy cooker" was a nickname for a British soldier's portable stove, which was fuelled by something referred to as solidified alcohol, making it smokeless though very inefficient.

In the 1995 film The Indian in the Cupboard, Omri brings a tiny British toy soldier to life and the soldier says his name is 'Tommy Atkins.'

Other nicknames
Present day English soldiers are often referred to as 'Toms' or just 'Tom' (the Scots equivalent being 'Jock'). Outside the services soldiers are generally known as 'Squaddies' by the British popular press. The British Army magazine Soldier has a regular cartoon strip, 'Tom', featuring the everyday life of a British soldier.

Junior officers in the army are generally known as 'Ruperts' by the other ranks. This nickname is believed to be derived from the children's comic book character Rupert Bear who epitomises traditional public school values (see Inside the British Army by Antony Beevor )

The term 'Pongo' or 'Perce' is often used by Sailors and Royal Marines to refer to soldiers.

The Royal Navy also has family nicknames, Jock being used for a family of longstanding naval engineers — although the legacy of Star Trek: The Original Series seems to have made the moniker Scotty become more popular.

See also 

 Alternative names for the British
 Brodie helmet
 Digger, Doughboy and Poilu for the Allied counterparts
 G.I.
 HMS Birkenhead (1845)
 Jack Tar
 Jerry (WWII)
 Joe Bloggs
 Kraut
 Limey
 Squaddie
 Mehmetçik and Johnny Turk

References

External links 

 Tommy Atkins Society British Second World War Reenactment Society in the UK, and winner of the Best Display Award at the Victory Show 2007 sponsored by the Armchair General Magazine
 "The last time I saw Tommy", illustrated poem by Joshua Quagmire
 The Last Tommy—a campaign to mark the passing of the last First World War Tommy with a state funeral.
 

History of the British Army
Military slang and jargon
Placeholder names